This is a list of calculators produced by Clive Sinclair's company Sinclair Radionics:

 Sinclair Cambridge
 Sinclair Cambridge Scientific
 Sinclair Cambridge Memory
 Sinclair Cambridge Memory %
 Sinclair Cambridge Scientific Programmable
 Sinclair Cambridge Universal
 Sinclair Executive
 Sinclair Executive
 Sinclair Executive Memory
 Sinclair Enterprise
 Sinclair Oxford
 Sinclair Oxford 100
 Sinclair Oxford 200
 Sinclair Oxford 300
 Sinclair Oxford Scientific
 Sinclair Oxford Universal
 Sinclair President
 Sinclair President
 Sinclair President Scientific
 Sinclair Scientific
 Sinclair Scientific
 Sinclair Scientific Programmable
 Sinclair Sovereign

This is a list of calculators produced by Clive Sinclair's company Sinclair Instrument:

 Sinclair Wrist Calculator

References

Calculators
Calculators

Technology-related lists